Ofek Melika-Aharon (born 23 January 2005) is an Israeli professional footballer who plays as a goalkeeper for Hapoel Ra'anana and the Israel national U-17 team.

Early life 
Melika-Aharon was born in Givatayim, Israel. He hails from a family of Israeli football goalkeepers, with his grandfather Shmuel Malika-Aharon and uncle Meir Melika, both playing for the Israel national team. He is also the son of Yaron Melika, who played as a goalkeeper in the Israeli Premier League.

Club career
Melika made his senior debut for Hapoel Ra'anana on 4 April 2022, playing 90 minutes in a Liga Leumit away match against Hapoel Ramat Gan, that ended in a 2–1 win.

International career
He is a youth International for Israel, who plays for the under-17 national team since 2021.

Career statistics

Club

See also 

 List of Jewish footballers
 List of Jews in sports
 List of Israelis

References

2005 births
Living people
Israeli footballers
Israel youth international footballers
Association football goalkeepers
Hapoel Ra'anana A.F.C. players
Liga Leumit players
Footballers from Givatayim

Israeli Jews